The canton of Charente-Bonnieure is an administrative division of the Charente department, southwestern France. It was created at the French canton reorganisation which came into effect in March 2015. Its seat is in Chasseneuil-sur-Bonnieure.

It consists of the following communes:
 
Alloue
Beaulieu-sur-Sonnette
Benest
Le Bouchage
Champagne-Mouton
Chasseneuil-sur-Bonnieure
Chassiecq
Cherves-Châtelars
Le Grand-Madieu
Lésignac-Durand
Le Lindois
Lussac
Massignac
Mazerolles
Montembœuf
Mouzon
Nieuil
Parzac
Les Pins
Roussines
Saint-Claud
Saint-Coutant
Saint-Laurent-de-Céris
Saint-Mary
Sauvagnac
Suaux
Terres-de-Haute-Charente (partly)
Turgon
Verneuil
Le Vieux-Cérier
Vieux-Ruffec
Vitrac-Saint-Vincent

References

Cantons of Charente